Actinoptera lindneri is a species of tephritid or fruit flies in the genus Actinoptera of the family Tephritidae.

Distribution
Tanzania.

References

Tephritinae
Insects described in 1954
Diptera of Africa